Salina is a town in Mayes County, Oklahoma, United States. The population was 1,396 at the 2010 census, a slight decline from the figure of 1,422 recorded in 2000.

History
For thousands of years indigenous peoples had lived along the rivers in this area, with varying cultures. By the time of European encounter, the Osage was a major tribe in the area. Their territory started at the Missouri River and extended west, including to parts of present-day Arkansas.

In 1541 the Spanish explorer Hernando de Soto and expedition passed through the area, as did the 1721 expedition of Bernard de la Harpe.  They gave Spanish names to many of the local streams, which the Osage had already named.

In 1796 Jean Pierre Chouteau, a French trader from St. Louis, established the first trading post in 1796 at the junction of the Grand/Neosho River and Saline Creek for business with the Osage. Remembered today as one of the first permanent "white" (European-American) settlements in present-day Oklahoma, at that time the area was part of the Spanish Louisiana. The United States took possession of the land that included Salina with the Louisiana Purchase in 1803.

By 1817, keelboats were landing goods at Salina from Ft. Smith, Arkansas, and the area was considered part of what was known as "Indian Territory" of the United States.  That year, Chouteau's son Auguste Pierre and his partner Joseph Revoir received an exclusive license from Spanish authorities to trade with the Osage. In 1820, the Spanish government of the time took the monopoly away. Chouteau convinced the Osage tribe, under the leadership of Cashesgra ("Big Trek"), to migrate into Indian Territory near the trading post, and ensured the survival of the business.

In 1820, the United States Department of War authorized Epaphras Chapman to establish the Union Mission near the mouth of Chouteau Creek to educate and convert the Osage. The mission had the first printing press in present-day Oklahoma. Under its policy of Indian Removal, the US government began to remove Native American tribes from the Southeast, giving them land in the Territory in exchange.

The Indians boiled salt from the water rising from limestone rock about a mile south of the trading post. Springs included one hot water geyser that shot boiling water 8 to  into the air. Chouteau obtained the springs in a treaty in 1825 and sold them to Sam Houston in 1830. A Cherokee, Captain John Rogers, began making salt from the springs and named them Grand Saline. He built his home nearby. Washington Irving visited  on October 6, 1832, accompanied by Sam Houston. In 1838 the government began moving Cherokee to the area in implementation of the Indian Removal Act.

By 1839, Rogers was operating 115 salt kettles. He lost the salt works in 1844 to the Cherokee Nation under a new law defining their territory. The Cherokee leased the works to Lewis Ross (brother of Chief John Ross).  Ross built a house there and operated the salt business using African American slave labor. Drilling for salt water, in 1859 Ross accidentally hit the first vein of oil in Indian Territory (Oklahoma). It flowed at the rate of 10 barrels a day for a year. He operated two stores in Salina.

In 1862 during the American Civil War, Union soldiers came down unopposed on the Grand River to Salina and set all slaves free. The soldiers ransacked the Ross home, had the slaves load everything on wagons, and hauled the goods across the border to the free state of Kansas.  In 1872 the Cherokee Nation purchased the Ross home for $26,000 and used it for years as the Cherokee Orphan Asylum. It was destroyed by fire in 1899. Reconstructed,  the structure is now used as a gym.

The Cherokee chief Samuel Houston Mayes established a ferry and mercantile business on the Grand River in 1906.

The establishment of the Old Chouteau Trading Post at Salina was commemorated on October 10–11, 1938 and has become an annual celebration. Among those speaking at the inaugural event were Governor-Elect Leon C. Phillips, Dr. M. L. Wardell of the University of Oklahoma, Mr. Thomas J. Harrison of Pryor, and Yvonne Chouteau, a descendant of Jean Pierre Chouteau.

Geography
Salina is located at  (36.292576, -95.152608). The town is situated on the eastern shore of Lake Hudson, formed by the impoundment of the Grand River.

Demographics

As of 2010 Salina had a population of 1,396.  The racial and ethnic composition of the population was 52.0% white, 0.1% African American, 37.5% Native American, 0.1% Asian, 0.1% from some other race and 10.2% reporting two or more races.  1.0% of the population was Hispanic or Latino.

As of the census of 2000, there were 1,422 people, 562 households, and 351 families residing in the town. There were 668 housing units at an average density of 646.0 per square mile (250.4/km2). The racial makeup of the town was 59.56% White, 0.14% African American, 34.74% Native American, 0.07% Asian, 0.28% from other races, and 5.20% from two or more races. Hispanic or Latino of any race were 2.04% of the population.

There were 562 households, out of which 29.4% had children under the age of 18 living with them, 45.2% were married couples living together, 12.6% had a female householder with no husband present, and 37.4% were non-families. 33.5% of all households were made up of individuals, and 15.7% had someone living alone who was 65 years of age or older. The average household size was 2.40 and the average family size was 3.10.

In the town, the population was spread out, with 25.6% under the age of 18, 9.4% from 18 to 24, 24.9% from 25 to 44, 23.1% from 45 to 64, and 16.9% who were 65 years of age or older. The median age was 36 years. For every 100 females, there were 93.2 males. For every 100 females age 18 and over, there were 87.6 males.

The median income for a household in the town was $23,519, and the median income for a family was $31,000. Males had a median income of $26,552 versus $17,292 for females. The per capita income for the town was $11,928. About 16.2% of families and 20.4% of the population were below the poverty line, including 24.7% of those under age 18 and 27.5% of those age 65 or over.

Historic Site

The Spring House, off Oklahoma State Highway 20, is an NRHP-listed location, being one of the oldest existing properties in the state, and also being important for its association with Lewis Ross, brother of Cherokee chief John Ross.  Lewis Ross settled in the area around 1838, building both a home and, in 1844, an octagonally-shaped spring house.  The home later became an orphanage and was destroyed by fire in 1903, but the spring house survived.

In popular culture
Salina is featured in the closing scene of the first episode of Disney+'s Loki in the Marvel Cinematic Universe. Authorities of the TVA travel to Salina in the year 1858, where they discover an unknown figure who ultimately kills them.

Notable people
Carl Belew, country music singer-songwriter
Gary Condit, former U.S. Representative

References

Towns in Mayes County, Oklahoma
Towns in Oklahoma